The Kaukomba River (Kaukomba, Kokumba, Kukumba) is a small river of Madang Province in Papua New Guinea. It joins Jabab Creek to form the Toto River, which enters the ocean just east of the village of Asuramba. It is located 600 km from Port Moresby.

See also 
Kaukombar River languages

References

Rivers of Papua New Guinea